Pruvotfolia rochebruni is a species of sea slug, an aeolid nudibranch, a marine gastropod mollusc in the family Facelinidae.

Distribution
This species was described from the Cape Verde Islands.

References 

Facelinidae
Gastropods described in 2002
Gastropods of Cape Verde